Brigadier General Erastus Nomongula Kashopola is a retired Namibian military officer. His last command was as the General Officer Commanding 21 Motorised Infantry Brigade.

Career
PLAN
His military career started in the 1970s when he joined the People's Liberation Army of Namibia in exile. He served in various roles until being appointed as an Artillery Unit chief of reconnaissance.

NDF
In 1990 he was a pioneer of the NDF officer corps as he was inducted with the rank of Captain. He served extensively in various command and support roles. He was the Commanding Officer of 44 Artillery Regiment, 263 Battalion, 262 Battalion. He commanded the fourth Namibian Battalion Iteration NAMBATT IV to Angola under MONUA. A combat veteran of the Second Congo War he was the Commanding officer of Battalion Group one the Namibian Army's first battalion rotation to DRC under its operation code-named Operation Atlantic.
He also commanded the first and fourth Namibian Battalion Iteration NAMBATT I & NAMBAT IV to Liberia under UNMIL Iteration between 2004 and 2007.

He also was the commandant of the Oshivelo Army Battle School. As a colonel he was also a Deputy Commander for 4 Artillery Brigade (Namibia) and also Deputy commander for 21 Motorised Infantry Brigade. He was then Promoted to Brigadier General and appointed as GOC 21 Motorised Infantry Brigade succeeding Brigadier General Phillip Shikuma Kamati who was appointed as Defence Inspector General. He retired in July 2019 and was succeeded by Brigadier General Martin Shikomba as GOC 21 Motorised Infantry Brigade.

Qualifications
Junior Command Course -India
Command and Staff Course-Tanzania
Diploma in Defence and Strategic Studies-China
Diploma in Modern Management and Administration -United Kingdom

Honours and decorations
  UNMIL Peacekeeping medal
  UNMIL Peacekeeping medal
  Campaign Medal with three gold award star
  MONUA Peacekeeping medal

References

1958 births
Living people
Namibian military personnel
People's Liberation Army of Namibia personnel